The Big Blow is a 2000 novel written by American author Joe R. Lansdale. It tells a fictional story of real life boxing great Jack Johnson.

Plot summary
It's the year 1900 and a major Hurricane is brewing in the Gulf of Mexico. Future real life boxing champion Jack Johnson is training for an upcoming fight the promoters have no interest in him winning. The boxing fans in Galveston, Texas are incensed since an African American fighter(Johnson) has soundly defeated the local white champion. So they send north to import John McBride, a dirty fighting racist hired to do one thing: defeat Johnson and restore the championship to a white fighter. All the while the 1900 Galveston Hurricane is moving north towards the Texas coast.

The short story on which this novel is based – which was originally published in the 1997 anthology edited by Douglas E. Winter called Revelations – won a 1997 Bram Stoker Award.

Editions
This book was published as a limited edition and trade hardcover by Subterranean Press and is long out of print.

Film Adaptation
Currently a film based on this novel is in production. Giannina Scott and Ridley Scott are producing at Scott Free.

External links
Author's Official Website
Publisher's Website

References

Novels by Joe R. Lansdale
2000 American novels
Fiction set in 1900
Novels about boxing
Biographical novels
Novels set in Texas
Culture of Galveston, Texas
Cultural depictions of Jack Johnson
Works by Joe R. Lansdale
Bram Stoker Award for Best Long Fiction winners
Subterranean Press books